Orange Playlist is a British music chat show TV series, produced by INITIAL, a subsidiary of Endemol UK for the ITV Network. The third series was presented by Jayne Middlemiss. A different guest each week joins Middlemiss to discuss their lives, nominating a variety of songs to be played, one from their future, past and present, as well as their favourite track of all time.

The show was originally presented by Lauren Laverne.

See also
Orange unsignedAct – a similar music TV show sponsored by Orange and featuring Laverne

References

External links

2004 British television series debuts
2007 British television series endings
2000s British music television series
ITV (TV network) original programming
Orange S.A.
Television series by Endemol
English-language television shows